Mjøndalen IF Fotball – commonly known as Mjøndalen IF, and (especially locally) Mjøndar'n or MIF – is the football department of Mjøndalen IF. Founded in 1910, the club is located in Mjøndalen, Viken, Norway. The team plays its home matches in the 4,350-capacity Consto Arena. Mjøndalen competes in Obos Ligaen, the second tier in the Norwegian football league system having been relegated from the Eliteserien at the end of the 2021 season.

History

First era
Mjøndalen reached the final of the 1924 Norwegian Cup where they lost 3–0 against Odd. In the 1930s, Mjøndalen won the Norwegian Cup three times; 1933, 1934 and 1937. They also lost three finals; in 1931, 1936 and 1938.

Second era and European debut
As runners-up in the 1968 Norwegian Cup, Mjøndalen men's football team represented Norway in the European Cup Winners' Cup in the following 1969–70 season. They were eliminated in the first round by Cardiff City who defeated Mjøndalen 12–2 on aggregate. After being promoted to the top division in 1971, Mjøndalen regularly played on the top-tier of Norwegian football in the 1970s and 1980s, and finished second in 1976 and 1986. Finishing runners-up in the league qualified them to represent Norway in the UEFA Cup the following season.

Middle years
The last round of the 1976 season saw Mjøndalen beat SK Brann, a result which would have awarded them the league title if Lillestrøm SK had lost their game — which they did not. However, Mjøndalen's silver medals saw the team qualify for the 1977–78 UEFA Cup, where they lost the first round against Bayern Munich 0–12 on aggregate. After Mjøndalen's second silver medals in the 1986 league season, they were relegated the following season and were not promoted back to the top level until 1992. A highlight from the years in lower divisions was their meeting with German side Werder Bremen in the first round of the 1987–88 UEFA Cup. Mjøndalen lost 1–5 on aggregate, but their 1–0 win away at Bremen, remain their only victory in UEFA competitions. After their 1992 top-flight comeback season, Mjøndalen was relegated, had financial challenges, and participated in the second, third and fourth tier of Norwegian football for a number of seasons.

Recent years
Mjøndalen had a successful 2008 in 2. divisjon, and returned to 1. divisjon for the 2009 season. The club qualified to compete in the promotion knock out stage of 1. divisjon in both 2012 and 2013, and finally earned promotion to the Tippeligaen with a successful 2014 play-off result against Brann. Mjøndalen's return to Tippeligaen for 2015 marked their first appearance in the top tier in 22 years. The team finished in 15th place — second from bottom — and was relegated to the 2016 1. divisjon. In 2018, Mjøndalen finished in second place in the 2018 1. divisjon and was promoted to Eliteserien. In the following season, Mjøndalen succeeded in retaining their spot in the top flight through winning on the last day of the season.

Honours

League
First tier
1. divisjon
Runners-up (2): 1976, 1986
Second tier
2. divisjon group A
Winners (4): 1971, 1978, 1981, 1984
1. divisjon
Winners (1): 1991

Cup
Norwegian Cup:
Winners (3): 1933, 1934, 1937
Runners-up (5): 1924, 1931, 1936, 1938, 1968

Recent seasons
{|class="wikitable"
|-bgcolor="#efefef"
! Season
! Tier (group)
! Pos.
! Pl.
! W
! D
! L
! GS
! GA
! Pts.
!Cup
!Notes
|-
|2001
|3. divisjon (gr. 9)
|align=right |4
|align=right|22||align=right|14||align=right|1||align=right|7
|align=right|60||align=right|34||align=right|43
||
|
|-
|2002
|3. divisjon (gr. 8)
|align=right|1
|align=right|22||align=right|16||align=right|3||align=right|3
|align=right|69||align=right|25||align=right|51
||dnq
|Lost play-offs for promotion
|-
|2003
|3. divisjon (gr. 8)
|align=right |5
|align=right|22||align=right|12||align=right|1||align=right|9
|align=right|70||align=right|37||align=right|37
||First qualifying round
|
|-
|2004
|3. divisjon (gr. 8)
|align=right|1
|align=right|22||align=right|17||align=right|3||align=right|2
|align=right|67||align=right|22||align=right|54
||First round
|Lost play-offs for promotion
|-
|2005
|3. divisjon (gr. 8)
|align=right|2
|align=right|22||align=right|20||align=right|1||align=right|1
|align=right|102||align=right|19||align=right|61
||First round
|
|-
|2006
|3. divisjon (gr. 7)
|align=right bgcolor=#DDFFDD| 1
|align=right|20||align=right|18||align=right|1||align=right|1
|align=right|102||align=right|22||align=right|55
||First round
|Promoted to 2. divisjon
|-
|2007
|2. divisjon (gr. 4)
|align=right|2
|align=right|26||align=right|14||align=right|7||align=right|5
|align=right|62||align=right|34||align=right|49
||Second round
|
|-
|2008
|2. divisjon (gr. 1)
|align=right bgcolor=#DDFFDD| 1
|align=right|26||align=right|17||align=right|4||align=right|5
|align=right|64||align=right|34||align=right|55
||First round
|Promoted to 1. divisjon|-
|2009
|1. divisjon
|align=right |11
|align=right|30||align=right|10||align=right|9||align=right|11
|align=right|38||align=right|39||align=right|39
|Fourth round
|
|-
|2010
|1. divisjon
|align=right |10
|align=right|28||align=right|10||align=right|5||align=right|13
|align=right|41||align=right|49||align=right|35
||Third round
|
|-
|2011
|1. divisjon
|align=right |10
|align=right|30||align=right|10||align=right|10||align=right|10
|align=right|42||align=right|51||align=right|40
||Third round
|
|-
|2012
|1. divisjon
|align=right |4
|align=right|30||align=right|16||align=right|7||align=right|7
|align=right|52||align=right|43||align=right|55
||Fourth round
|Lost playoffs for promotion|-
|2013 
|1. divisjon
|align=right |6
| align="right" |30|| align="right" |14||align=right|5||align=right|11
| align="right" |37|| align="right" |40||align=right|47
||Quarter-final
|Lost play-offs for promotion|-
|2014
|1. divisjon
|align=right bgcolor=#DDFFDD| 3
|align=right|30||align=right|14||align=right|9||align=right|7
|align=right|57||align=right|36||align=right|51
||Fourth round
|Promoted to Tippeligaen|-
|2015
|Tippeligaen
|align=right bgcolor="#FFCCCC"| 15
|align=right|30||align=right|4||align=right|9||align=right|17
|align=right|38||align=right|69||align=right|21
||Quarter-final
|Relegated to 1. divisjon|-
|2016 
|1. divisjon
|align=right |6
|align=right|30||align=right|13||align=right|10||align=right|7
|align=right|49||align=right|38||align=right|48
||Second round
|Lost play-offs for promotion|-
|2017
|1. divisjon
|align=right |3
|align=right|30||align=right|15||align=right|7||align=right|8
|align=right|56||align=right|37||align=right|52
||Quarter-final
|
|-
|2018
|1. divisjon
|align=right bgcolor=#DDFFDD| 2
|align=right|30||align=right|17||align=right|9||align=right|4
|align=right|49||align=right|24||align=right|60
||Fourth round
|Promoted to Eliteserien|-
|2019 
|Eliteserien
|align=right |13
|align=right|30||align=right|6||align=right|12||align=right|12
|align=right|38||align=right|52||align=right|30
||Quarter-final
|
|-
|2020 
|Eliteserien
|align=right |14
|align=right|30||align=right|8||align=right|3||align=right|19
|align=right|26||align=right|45||align=right|27
||Cancelled
|
|-
|2021 
|Eliteserien
|align=right bgcolor="#FFCCCC"| 16
|align=right|30||align=right|4||align=right|10||align=right|16
|align=right|33||align=right|52||align=right|22
||Third round
|Relegated to 1. divisjon|-
|2022
|1. divisjon
|align=right |9
|align=right|30||align=right|13||align=right|3||align=right|14
|align=right|39||align=right|47||align=right|42
||Second round
|
|}
Source:

European record

Current squadFor season transfers, see transfers winter 2021–22 and transfers summer 2022.''

History of league positions (since 1963)

References

Notes

Further reading

External links 
 Official website

 
Football clubs in Norway
Eliteserien clubs
Association football clubs established in 1910
1910 establishments in Norway
Fotball
Sport in Buskerud
Nedre Eiker